Kamrieng is a khum (commune) of Kamrieng District in Battambang Province in north-western Cambodia.

Villages

References

Communes of Battambang province
Kamrieng District